Delias mullerensis is a butterfly in the family Pieridae. It was described by Sadaharu Morinaka and T. Nakazawa in 1999. It is found in the Muller Range in the Central Highlands of Papua New Guinea.

References

External links
Delias at Markku Savela's Lepidoptera and Some Other Life Forms

mullerensis
Butterflies described in 1999